The following lists events that happened in 1923 in Iceland.

Incumbents
Monarch – Kristján X
Prime Minister – Sigurður Eggerz

Events
27 October – Icelandic parliamentary election, 1923
1923 Úrvalsdeild

Births
5 February – Friðjón Þórðarson, politician (d. 2009).
25 February – Jón Örn Jónasson, footballer
26 March – Hörður Óskarsson, footballer
10 April – Gunnlaugur Lárusson, footballer
5 May – Magnús Torfi Ólafsson, politician (d. 1998)
2 June – Einar Halldórsson, footballer
3 June – Pálmi Jónsson, businessman (d. 1991)
29 June – Guðmundur Kjærnested, military officer (d. 2005)
21 July – Tómas Árnason, politician (d. 2014).
1 October – Hafsteinn Guðmundsson, footballer
5 October – Albert Guðmundsson, footballer (d. 1994)
4 November – Gunnar Huseby, track and field athlete (d. 1995)
24 November – Halldóra Eldjárn, First Lady of Iceland (d. 2008)

Deaths

References

 
1920s in Iceland
Iceland
Iceland
Years of the 20th century in Iceland